Abdullah Tarakhail (born 5 December 2000) is an Afghan cricketer. He made his first-class debut for Kabul Region in the 2019 Ahmad Shah Abdali 4-day Tournament on 29 April 2019. He made his List A debut for Herat Province in the 2019 Afghanistan Provincial Challenge Cup tournament on 1 August 2019.

References

External links
 

2000 births
Living people
Afghan cricketers
Kabul Eagles cricketers
Place of birth missing (living people)